Myra Tanner Weiss (May 17, 1917 – September 13, 1997) was an American Communist following Trotskyism, and a three time U.S. Vice Presidential candidate of the Socialist Workers Party (SWP).

Myra Tanner was recruited to the American Trotskyist movement in 1935, while at the University of Utah in Salt Lake City. In 1942, she married Murry Weiss, also a member of the SWP. They were living and working for the Party in Los Angeles, and Myra Tanner ran for the mayor of Los Angeles in 1945 and 1949.

Myra Tanner Weiss was the SWP's vice-presidential candidate in 1952, 1956 and 1960, with Farrell Dobbs running for President of the United States. Later in life, she and her husband Murry Weiss became political supporters of the Freedom Socialist Party.

Members of the Freedom Socialist Party
1952 United States vice-presidential candidates
1956 United States vice-presidential candidates
1960 United States vice-presidential candidates
1917 births
1997 deaths
Socialist Workers Party (United States) vice presidential nominees
Female candidates for Vice President of the United States
Socialist Workers Party (United States) politicians from California
American Trotskyists